Lionel Browne (14 December 1909 – 22 December 1997) was a New Zealand cricketer. He played in two first-class matches for Wellington from 1928 to 1931.

See also
 List of Wellington representative cricketers

References

External links
 

1909 births
1997 deaths
New Zealand cricketers
Wellington cricketers
Cricketers from Wellington City